Cape Canso is a headland located at the eastern extremity of the Nova Scotia peninsula in the Canadian province of Nova Scotia.

Headlands of Nova Scotia
Landforms of Guysborough County, Nova Scotia